Lorazepam, sold under the brand name Ativan among others, is a benzodiazepine medication. It is used to treat anxiety disorders, trouble sleeping, severe agitation, active seizures including status epilepticus, alcohol withdrawal, and chemotherapy-induced nausea and vomiting. It is also used during surgery to interfere with memory formation and to sedate those who are being mechanically ventilated. It is also used, along with other treatments, for acute coronary syndrome due to cocaine use. It can be given by mouth or as an injection into a muscle or vein. When given by injection onset of effects is between one and thirty minutes and effects last for up to a day.

Common side effects include weakness, sleepiness, low blood pressure, and a decreased effort to breathe. When given intravenously, the person should be closely monitored. Among those who are depressed, there may be an increased risk of suicide. With long-term use, larger doses may be required for the same effect. Physical dependence and psychological dependence may also occur. If stopped suddenly after long-term use, benzodiazepine withdrawal syndrome may occur. Older people more often develop adverse effects. In this age group, lorazepam is associated with falls and hip fractures. Due to these concerns, lorazepam use is generally only recommended for up to two to four weeks.

Lorazepam was initially patented in 1963 and went on sale in the United States in 1977. It is on the World Health Organization's List of Essential Medicines. It is available as a generic medication. In 2020, it was the 65th most commonly prescribed medication in the United States, with more than 10million prescriptions.

Medical uses

Anxiety
Lorazepam is used in the short-term management of severe anxiety. In the US, the FDA advises against use of benzodiazepines such as lorazepam for longer than four weeks. It is fast acting, and useful in treating fast onset panic anxiety.

Lorazepam can effectively reduce agitation and induce sleep, and the duration of effects from a single dose makes it an appropriate choice for the short-term treatment of insomnia, especially in the presence of severe anxiety or night terrors. It has a fairly short duration of action.

Withdrawal symptoms, including rebound insomnia and rebound anxiety, may occur after seven days' use of lorazepam.

Seizures
Intravenous diazepam or lorazepam are first-line treatments for convulsive status epilepticus. Lorazepam is more effective than diazepam and intravenous phenytoin in the treatment of status epilepticus and has a lower risk of continuing seizures that might require additional medication. However, phenobarbital has a superior success rate compared to lorazepam and other drugs, at least in the elderly.

Lorazepam's anticonvulsant properties and pharmacokinetic profile make intravenous use reliable for terminating acute seizures, but induce prolonged sedation. Oral benzodiazepines, including lorazepam, are occasionally used as long-term prophylactic treatment of resistant absence seizures; because of gradual tolerance to their anti-seizure effects, benzodiazepines such as lorazepam are not considered first-line therapies.

Lorazepam's anticonvulsant and CNS depressant properties are useful for the treatment and prevention of alcohol withdrawal syndrome. In this setting, impaired liver function is not a hazard with lorazepam, since lorazepam does not require oxidation, in the liver or otherwise, for its metabolism.

Sedation
Lorazepam is sometimes used for individuals receiving mechanical ventilation. However, in critically ill people, propofol has been found to be superior to lorazepam both in effectiveness and overall cost; as a result, the use of propofol for this indication is now encouraged, whereas the use of lorazepam is discouraged.

Its relative effectiveness in preventing new memory formation, along with its ability to reduce agitation and anxiety, makes lorazepam useful as premedication. It is given before a general anesthetic to reduce the amount of anesthetic required, or before unpleasant awake procedures, such as in dentistry or endoscopies, to reduce anxiety, to increase compliance, and to induce amnesia for the procedure. Lorazepam by mouth is given 90 to 120 minutes before procedures, and intravenous lorazepam as late as 10 minutes before procedures. Lorazepam is sometimes used as an alternative to midazolam in palliative sedation. In intensive care units lorazepam is sometimes used to produce anxiolysis, hypnosis, and amnesia.

Agitation
Lorazepam is sometimes used as an alternative to haloperidol when there is the need for rapid sedation of violent or agitated individuals, but haloperidol plus promethazine is preferred due to better effectiveness and due to lorazepam's adverse effects on respiratory function. However, adverse effects such as behavioral disinhibition may make benzodiazepines inappropriate for some people who are acutely psychotic . Acute delirium is sometimes treated with lorazepam, but as it can cause paradoxical effects, it is preferably given together with haloperidol. Lorazepam is absorbed relatively slowly if given intramuscularly, a common route in restraint situations.

Other
Catatonia with inability to speak is responsive to lorazepam. Symptoms may recur and treatment for some days may be necessary. Catatonia due to abrupt or overly rapid withdrawal from benzodiazepines, as part of the benzodiazepine withdrawal syndrome, should also respond to lorazepam treatment. As lorazepam can have paradoxical effects, haloperidol is sometimes given at the same time.

It is sometimes used in chemotherapy in addition to medications used to treat nausea and vomiting, i.e. nausea and vomiting caused or worsened by psychological sensitization to the thought of being sick.

Adverse effects 
Many beneficial effects of lorazepam (e.g., sedative, muscle relaxant, anti-anxiety, and amnesic effects) may become adverse effects when unwanted. Adverse effects can include sedation and low blood pressure; the effects of lorazepam are increased in combination with other CNS depressant drugs. Other adverse effects include confusion, ataxia, inhibiting the formation of new memories, pupil constriction and hangover effects. With long-term benzodiazepine use it is unclear whether cognitive impairments fully return to normal after stopping lorazepam use; cognitive deficits persist for at least six months after withdrawal, but longer than six months may be required for recovery of cognitive function. Lorazepam appears to have more profound adverse effects on memory than other benzodiazepines; it impairs both explicit and implicit memory. In the elderly, falls may occur as a result of benzodiazepines. Adverse effects are more common in the elderly, and they appear at lower doses than in younger people. Benzodiazepines can cause or worsen depression. Paradoxical effects can also occur, such as worsening of seizures, or paradoxical excitement; paradoxical excitement is more likely to occur in the elderly, children, those with a history of alcohol abuse, and in people with a history of aggression or anger problems. Lorazepam's effects are dose-dependent, meaning the higher the dose, the stronger the effects (and side effects) will be. Using the smallest dose needed to achieve desired effects lessens the risk of adverse effects. Sedative drugs and sleeping pills, including lorazepam, have been associated with an increased risk of death.

Sedation is the side effect people taking lorazepam most frequently report. In a group of around 3,500 people treated for anxiety, the most common side effects complained of from lorazepam were sedation (15.9%), dizziness (6.9%), weakness (4.2%), and unsteadiness (3.4%). Side effects such as sedation and unsteadiness increased with age. Cognitive impairment, behavioural disinhibition and respiratory depression as well as hypotension may also occur.
 Paradoxical effects: In some cases, paradoxical effects can occur with benzodiazepines, such as increased hostility, aggression, angry outbursts, and psychomotor agitation. These effects are seen more commonly with lorazepam than with other benzodiazepines. Paradoxical effects are more likely to occur with higher doses, in people with pre-existing personality disorders and those with a psychiatric illness. Frustrating stimuli may trigger such reactions, though the drug may have been prescribed to help the person cope with such stress and frustration in the first place. As paradoxical effects appear to be dose-related, they usually subside on dose reduction or on complete withdrawal of lorazepam.
 Suicidality: Benzodiazepines are associated with increased risk of suicide, possibly due to disinhibition. Higher dosages appear to confer greater risk.
 Amnesic effects: Among benzodiazepines, lorazepam has relatively strong amnesic effects, but people soon develop tolerance to this with regular use. To avoid amnesia (or excess sedation) being a problem, the initial total daily lorazepam dose should not exceed 2 mg. This also applies to use for night sedation. Five participants in a sleep study were prescribed lorazepam 4 mg at night, and the next evening, three subjects unexpectedly volunteered memory gaps for parts of that day, an effect that subsided completely after two to three days' use. Amnesic effects cannot be estimated from the degree of sedation present, since the two effects are unrelated.
 High-dose or prolonged parenterally administered lorazepam with its associated solvent can cause propylene glycol intoxication and poisoning.

In September 2020, the U.S. Food and Drug Administration (FDA) required the boxed warning be updated for all benzodiazepine medicines to describe the risks of abuse, misuse, addiction, physical dependence, and withdrawal reactions consistently across all the medicines in the class.

Contraindications 

Lorazepam should be avoided in people with:
 Allergy or hypersensitivity – Past hypersensitivity or allergy to lorazepam, to any benzodiazepine, or to any of the ingredients in lorazepam tablets or injections
 Respiratory failure – Benzodiazepines, including lorazepam, may depress central nervous system respiratory drive and are contraindicated in severe respiratory failure. An example would be the inappropriate use to relieve anxiety associated with acute severe asthma. The anxiolytic effects may also be detrimental to a person's willingness and ability to fight for breath. However, if mechanical ventilation becomes necessary, lorazepam may be used to facilitate deep sedation.
 Acute intoxication – Lorazepam may interact synergistically with the effects of alcohol, narcotics, or other psychoactive substances. It should, therefore, not be administered to a drunk or intoxicated person.
 Ataxia – This is a neurological clinical sign, consisting of unsteady and clumsy motion of the limbs and torso, due to the failure of gross muscle movement coordination, most evident on standing and walking. It is the classic way in which acute alcohol intoxication may affect a person. Benzodiazepines should not be administered to people already-ataxic.
 Acute narrow-angle glaucoma – Lorazepam has pupil-dilating effects, which may further interfere with the drainage of aqueous humor from the anterior chamber of the eye, thus worsening narrow-angle glaucoma.
 Sleep apnea – Sleep apnea may be worsened by lorazepam's central nervous system depressant effects. It may further reduce the person's ability to protect his or her airway during sleep.
 Myasthenia gravis – This condition is characterized by muscle weakness, so a muscle relaxant such as lorazepam may exacerbate symptoms.
 Pregnancy and breastfeeding – Lorazepam belongs to the Food and Drug Administration (FDA) pregnancy category D, which means it is likely to cause harm to the developing baby if taken during the first trimester of pregnancy. The evidence is inconclusive whether lorazepam if taken early in pregnancy results in reduced intelligence, neurodevelopmental problems, physical malformations in cardiac or facial structure, or other malformations in some newborns. Lorazepam given to pregnant women antenatally may cause floppy infant syndrome in the neonate, or respiratory depression necessitating ventilation. Regular lorazepam use during late pregnancy (the third trimester), carries a definite risk of benzodiazepine withdrawal syndrome in the neonate. Neonatal benzodiazepine withdrawal may include hypotonia, reluctance to suck, apneic spells, cyanosis, and impaired metabolic responses to cold stress. Symptoms of floppy infant syndrome and the neonatal benzodiazepine withdrawal syndrome have been reported to persist from hours to months after birth. Lorazepam may also inhibit fetal liver bilirubin glucuronidation, leading to neonatal jaundice. Lorazepam is present in breast milk, so caution must be exercised about breastfeeding.

Specific groups 
 Children and the elderly – The safety and effectiveness of lorazepam is not well determined in children under 18 years of age, but it is used to treat acute seizures. Dose requirements have to be individualized, especially in people who are elderly and debilitated in whom the risk of oversedation is greater. Long-term therapy may lead to cognitive deficits, especially in the elderly, which may only be partially reversible. The elderly metabolize benzodiazepines more slowly than younger people and are more sensitive to the adverse effects of benzodiazepines compared to younger individuals even at similar plasma levels. Additionally, the elderly tend to take more drugs which may interact or enhance the effects of benzodiazepines. Benzodiazepines, including lorazepam, have been found to increase the risk of falls and fractures in the elderly. As a result, dosage recommendations for the elderly are about half of those used in younger individuals and used for no longer than two weeks. Lorazepam may also be slower to clear in the elderly, leading potentially to accumulation and enhanced effects. Lorazepam, similar to other benzodiazepines and nonbenzodiazepines, causes impairments in body balance and standing steadiness in individuals who wake up at night or the next morning. Falls and hip fractures are frequently reported. The combination with alcohol increases these impairments. Partial, but incomplete, tolerance develops to these impairments.
 Liver or kidney failure – Lorazepam may be safer than most benzodiazepines in people with impaired liver function. Like oxazepam, it does not require liver oxidation, but only liver glucuronidation into lorazepam-glucuronide. Therefore, impaired liver function is unlikely to result in lorazepam accumulation to an extent causing adverse reactions. Similarly kidney disease has minimal effects on lorazepam levels.
 Surgical premedication – Informed consent given only after receiving lorazepam premedication could have its validity challenged later. Staff must use chaperones to guard against allegations of abuse during treatment. Such allegations may arise because of incomplete amnesia, disinhibition, and impaired ability to process cues. Because of its relatively long duration of residual effects (sedation, ataxia, hypotension, and amnesia), lorazepam premedication is best suited for hospital inpatient use. People should not be discharged from the hospital within 24 hours of receiving lorazepam premedication unless accompanied by a caregiver. They should also not drive, operate machinery, or use alcohol within this period.
 Drug and alcohol dependence – The risk of abuse of lorazepam is increased in dependent people.
Comorbid psychiatric disorders also increase the risk of dependence and paradoxical adverse effects.

Tolerance and dependence 
Dependence typified by a withdrawal syndrome occurs in about one-third of individuals who are treated for longer than four weeks with a benzodiazepine. Higher doses and longer periods of use increase the risk of developing a benzodiazepine dependence. Potent benzodiazepines with a relatively short half life, such as lorazepam, alprazolam, and triazolam, have the highest risk of causing a dependence. Tolerance to benzodiazepine effects develops with regular use. This is desirable with amnesic and sedative effects but undesirable with anxiolytic, hypnotic, and anticonvulsant effects. People initially experience drastic relief from anxiety and sleeplessness, but symptoms gradually return, relatively soon in the case of insomnia, but more slowly in the case of anxiety symptoms. After four to six months of regular benzodiazepine use, evidence of continued efficacy declines.

If regular treatment is continued for longer than four to six months, dose increases may be necessary to maintain effects, but treatment-resistant symptoms may in fact be benzodiazepine withdrawal symptoms. Due to the development of tolerance to the anticonvulsant effects, benzodiazepines are generally not recommended for long-term use for the management of epilepsy. Increasing the dose may overcome tolerance, but tolerance may then develop to the higher dose and adverse effects may persist and worsen. The mechanism of tolerance to benzodiazepines is complex and involves GABAA receptor downregulation, alterations to subunit configuration of GABAA receptors, uncoupling and internalisation of the benzodiazepine binding site from the GABAA receptor complex as well as changes in gene expression.

The likelihood of dependence is relatively high with lorazepam compared to other benzodiazepines. Lorazepam's relatively short serum half-life, its confinement mainly to blood, and its inactive metabolite can result in interdose withdrawal phenomena and next-dose cravings, that may reinforce psychological dependence. Because of its high potency, the smallest lorazepam tablet strength of 0.5 mg is also a significant dose. To minimise the risk of physical/psychological dependence, lorazepam is best used only short-term, at the smallest effective dose. If any benzodiazepine has been used long-term, the recommendation is a gradual dose taper over a period of weeks, months or longer, according to dose and duration of use, the degree of dependence and the individual.

Coming off long-term lorazepam use may be more realistically achieved by a gradual switch to an equivalent dose of diazepam and a period of stabilization on this, and only then initiating dose reductions. The advantage of switching to diazepam is that dose reductions are felt less acutely, because of the longer half-lives (20–200 hours) of diazepam and its active metabolites.

Withdrawal 
On abrupt or overly rapid discontinuation of lorazepam, anxiety, and signs of physical withdrawal have been observed, similar to those seen on withdrawal from alcohol and barbiturates. Lorazepam, as with other benzodiazepine drugs, can cause physical dependence, addiction, and benzodiazepine withdrawal syndrome. The higher the dose and the longer the drug is taken, the greater the risk of experiencing unpleasant withdrawal symptoms. Withdrawal symptoms can, however, occur from standard dosages and also after short-term use. Benzodiazepine treatment should be discontinued as soon as possible via a slow and gradual dose reduction regimen. Rebound effects often resemble the condition being treated, but typically at a more intense level and may be difficult to diagnose. Withdrawal symptoms can range from mild anxiety and insomnia to more severe symptoms such as seizures and psychosis. The risk and severity of withdrawal are increased with long-term use, use of high doses, abrupt or over-rapid reduction, among other factors. Short-acting benzodiazepines such as lorazepam are more likely to cause a more severe withdrawal syndrome compared to longer-acting benzodiazepines.

Withdrawal symptoms can occur after taking therapeutic doses of lorazepam for as little as one week. Withdrawal symptoms include headaches, anxiety, tension, depression, insomnia, restlessness, confusion, irritability, sweating, dysphoria, dizziness, derealization, depersonalization, numbness/tingling of extremities, hypersensitivity to light, sound, and smell, perceptual distortions, nausea, vomiting, diarrhea, appetite loss, hallucinations, delirium, seizures, tremor, stomach cramps, myalgia, agitation, palpitations, tachycardia, panic attacks, short-term memory loss, and hyperthermia. It takes about 18–36 hours for the benzodiazepine to be removed from the body. The ease of physical dependence to lorazepam, (Ativan brand was particularly cited), and its withdrawal were brought to the attention of the British public during the early 1980s in Esther Rantzen's BBC TV series That's Life!, in a feature on the drug over a number of episodes.

Interactions 
Lorazepam is not usually fatal in overdose, but may cause respiratory depression if taken in overdose with alcohol. The combination also causes greater enhancement of the disinhibitory and amnesic effects of both drugs, with potentially embarrassing or criminal consequences. Some experts advise that people should be warned against drinking alcohol while on lorazepam treatment, but such clear warnings are not universal.

Greater adverse effects may also occur when lorazepam is used with other drugs, such as opioids or other hypnotics. Lorazepam may also interact with rifabutin. Valproate inhibits the metabolism of lorazepam, whereas carbamazepine, lamotrigine, phenobarbital, phenytoin, and rifampin increase its rate of metabolism. Some antidepressants, antiepileptic drugs such as phenobarbital, phenytoin and carbamazepine, sedative antihistamines, opiates, antipsychotics and alcohol, when taken with lorazepam may result in enhanced sedative effects.

Overdose 

In cases of a suspected lorazepam overdose, it is important to establish whether the person is a regular user of lorazepam or other benzodiazepines since regular use causes tolerance to develop. Also, one must ascertain whether other substances were also ingested.

Signs of overdose range through mental confusion, dysarthria, paradoxical reactions, drowsiness, hypotonia, ataxia, hypotension, hypnotic state, coma, cardiovascular depression, respiratory depression, and death. However, fatal overdoses on benzodiazepines alone are rare and less common than with barbiturates. Such a difference is largely due to benzodiazepine activity as a neuroreceptor modulator, and not as an activator per se. Lorazepam and similar medications do however act in synergy with alcohol, which increases the risk of overdose.

Early management of  people under alert includes emetics, gastric lavage, and activated charcoal. Otherwise, management is by observation, including of vital signs, support and, only if necessary, considering the hazards of doing so, giving intravenous flumazenil.

People are ideally nursed in a kind, frustration-free environment, since, when given or taken in high doses, benzodiazepines are more likely to cause paradoxical reactions. If shown sympathy, even quite crudely feigned, people may respond solicitously, but they may respond with disproportionate aggression to frustrating cues. Opportunistic counseling has limited value here, as the person is unlikely to recall this later, owing to drug-induced anterograde amnesia.

Detection in body fluids 
Lorazepam may be quantitated in blood or plasma to confirm poisoning in hospitalized people, provide evidence of an impaired driving arrest or to assist in a medicolegal death investigation. Blood or plasma concentrations are usually in a range of 10–300 μg/L in persons either receiving the drug therapeutically or in those arrested for impaired driving. Approximately 300–1000 μg/L is found in people after acute overdosage. Lorazepam may not be detected by commonly used urine drug screenings for benzodiazepines.

Pharmacology 
Lorazepam has anxiolytic, sedative, hypnotic, amnesic, anticonvulsant, and muscle relaxant properties. It is a high-potency and an  benzodiazepine, and its uniqueness, advantages, and disadvantages are largely explained by its pharmacokinetic properties (poor water and lipid solubility, high protein binding and anoxidative metabolism to a pharmacologically inactive glucuronide form) and by its high relative potency (lorazepam 1 mg is equal in effect to diazepam 10 mg). The biological half-life of lorazepam is 10–20 hours.

Pharmacokinetics 
Lorazepam is highly protein bound and is extensively metabolized into pharmacologically inactive metabolites. Due to its poor lipid solubility, lorazepam is absorbed relatively slowly by mouth and is unsuitable for rectal administration. However, its poor lipid solubility and high degree of protein binding (85–90%) mean its volume of distribution is mainly the vascular compartment, causing relatively prolonged peak effects. This contrasts with the highly lipid-soluble diazepam, which, although rapidly absorbed orally or rectally, soon redistributes from the serum to other parts of the body, in particular, body fat. This explains why one lorazepam dose, despite its shorter serum half-life, has more prolonged peak effects than an equivalent diazepam dose. Lorazepam is rapidly conjugated at its 3-hydroxy group into lorazepam glucuronide which is then excreted in the urine. Lorazepam glucuronide has no demonstrable CNS activity in animals. The plasma levels of lorazepam are proportional to the dose given. There is no evidence of accumulation of lorazepam on administration up to six months. On regular administration, diazepam will accumulate, since it has a longer half-life and active metabolites, these metabolites also have long half-lives.

Clinical example: Diazepam has long been a drug of choice for status epilepticus; its high lipid solubility means it gets absorbed with equal speed whether given orally, or rectally (nonintravenous routes are convenient in outside hospital settings), but diazepam's high lipid solubility also means it does not remain in the vascular space, but soon redistributes into other body tissues. So, it may be necessary to repeat diazepam doses to maintain peak anticonvulsant effects, resulting in excess body accumulation. Lorazepam is a different case; its low lipid solubility makes it relatively slowly absorbed by any route other than intravenously, but once injected, it will not get significantly redistributed beyond the vascular space. Therefore, lorazepam's anticonvulsant effects are more durable, thus reducing the need for repeated doses. If a person is known to usually stop convulsing after only one or two diazepam doses, it may be preferable because sedative after effects will be less than if a single dose of lorazepam is given (diazepam anticonvulsant/sedative effects wear off after 15–30 minutes, but lorazepam effects last 12–24 hours). The prolonged sedation from lorazepam may, however, be an acceptable trade-off for its reliable duration of effects, particularly if the person needs to be transferred to another facility. Although lorazepam is not necessarily better than diazepam at initially terminating seizures, lorazepam is, nevertheless, replacing diazepam as the intravenous agent of choice in status epilepticus.

Lorazepam serum levels are proportional to the dose administered. Giving 2 mg oral lorazepam will result in a peak total serum level of around 20 ng/mL around two hours later, half of which is lorazepam, half its inactive metabolite, lorazepam-glucuronide. A similar lorazepam dose given intravenously will result in an earlier and higher peak serum level, with a higher relative proportion of unmetabolised (active) lorazepam. On regular administration, maximum serum levels are attained after three days. Longer-term use, up to six months, does not result in further accumulation. On discontinuation, lorazepam serum levels become negligible after three days and undetectable after about a week. Lorazepam is metabolized in the liver by conjugation into inactive lorazepam-glucuronide. This metabolism does not involve liver oxidation, so is relatively unaffected by reduced liver function. Lorazepam-glucuronide is more water-soluble than its precursor, so gets more widely distributed in the body, leading to a longer half-life than lorazepam. Lorazepam-glucuronide is eventually excreted by the kidneys, and, because of its tissue accumulation, it remains detectable, particularly in the urine, for substantially longer than lorazepam.

Pharmacodynamics 
Relative to other benzodiazepines, lorazepam is thought to have high affinity for GABA receptors, which may also explain its marked amnesic effects. Its main pharmacological effects are the enhancement of the effects of the neurotransmitter GABA at the GABAA receptor. Benzodiazepines, such as lorazepam, enhance the effects of GABA at the GABAA receptor via increasing the frequency of opening of the chloride ion channel on the GABAA receptors; which results in the therapeutic actions of benzodiazepines. They, however, do not on their own activate the GABAA receptors, but require the neurotransmitter GABA to be present. Thus, the effect of benzodiazepines is to enhance the effects of the neurotransmitter GABA.

The magnitude and duration of lorazepam effects are dose-related, meaning larger doses have stronger and longer-lasting effects, because the brain has spare benzodiazepine drug receptor capacity, with single, clinical doses leading only to an occupancy of some 3% of the available receptors.

The anticonvulsant properties of lorazepam and other benzodiazepines may be, in part or entirely, due to binding to voltage-dependent sodium channels rather than benzodiazepine receptors. Sustained repetitive firing seems to get limited, by the benzodiazepine effect of slowing recovery of sodium channels from inactivation to deactivation in mouse spinal cord cell cultures, hence prolonging the refractory period.

Physical properties and formulations 

Pure lorazepam is an almost white powder that is nearly insoluble in water and oil. In medicinal form, it is mainly available as tablets and a solution for injection, but, in some locations, it is also available as a skin patch, an oral solution, and a sublingual tablet.

Lorazepam tablets and syrups are administered by mouth only. Lorazepam tablets of the Ativan brand also contain lactose, microcrystalline cellulose, polacrilin, magnesium stearate, and coloring agents (indigo carmine in blue tablets and tartrazine in yellow tablets). Lorazepam for injection formulated with polyethylene glycol 400 in propylene glycol with 2.0% benzyl alcohol as preservative.

Lorazepam injectable solution is administered either by deep intramuscular injection or by intravenous injection. The injectable solution comes in 1 mL ampoules containing 2 or 4 mg of lorazepam. The solvents used are polyethylene glycol 400 and propylene glycol. As a preservative, the injectable solution contains benzyl alcohol. Toxicity from propylene glycol has been reported in the case of a person receiving a continuous lorazepam infusion. Intravenous injections should be given slowly and they should be closely monitored for side effects, such as respiratory depression, hypotension, or loss of airway control.

Peak effects roughly coincide with peak serum levels, which occur 10 minutes after intravenous injection, up to 60 minutes after intramuscular injection, and 90 to 120 minutes after oral administration, but initial effects will be noted before this. A clinically relevant lorazepam dose will normally be effective for six to 12 hours, making it unsuitable for regular once-daily administration, so it is usually prescribed as two to four daily doses when taken regularly, but this may be extended to five or six, especially in the case of elderly people who could not handle large doses at once.

Topical formulations of lorazepam, while used as treatment for nausea especially in people in hospice, ought not be used in this form and for this purpose as they have not been proven effective.

History 

Historically, lorazepam is one of the "classical" benzodiazepines. Others include diazepam, clonazepam, oxazepam, nitrazepam, flurazepam, bromazepam, and clorazepate. Lorazepam was first introduced by Wyeth Pharmaceuticals in 1977 under the brand names Ativan and Temesta. The drug was developed by D.J. Richards, president of research. Wyeth's original patent on lorazepam is expired in the United States.

Society and culture

Recreational use 

Lorazepam is also used for other purposes, such as recreational use, wherein the drug is taken to achieve a high, or when the drug is continued long-term against medical advice.

A large-scale, nationwide, U.S. government study of pharmaceutical-related emergency department visits by SAMHSA found sedative-hypnotics are the pharmaceuticals most frequently used outside of their prescribed medical purpose in the United States, with 35% of drug-related emergency department visits involving sedative-hypnotics. In this category, benzodiazepines are most commonly used. Males and females use benzodiazepines for nonmedical purposes equally. Of drugs used in attempted suicide, benzodiazepines are the most commonly used pharmaceutical drugs, with 26% of attempted suicides involving them. Lorazepam was the third-most-common benzodiazepine used outside of prescription in these ER visit statistics.

Legal status 
Lorazepam is a Schedule IV drug under the Controlled Substances Act in the U.S. and internationally under the United Nations Convention on Psychotropic Substances. It is a Schedule IV drug under the Controlled Drugs and Substances Act in Canada. In the United Kingdom, it is a Class C, Schedule 4 Controlled Drug under the Misuse of Drugs Regulations 2001.

Pricing 
In 2000, the U.S. drug company Mylan agreed to pay $147 million to settle accusations by the FTC that they had raised the price of generic lorazepam by 2600% and generic clorazepate by 3200% in 1998 after having obtained exclusive licensing agreements for certain ingredients.

References

External links 
 inchem.org – Lorazepam data sheet
 benzo.org.uk – Ashton H. Benzodiazepines: How They Work And How to Withdraw. August 2002 (The "Ashton Manual").
 

Antiemetics
Anxiolytics
Benzodiazepines
Wyeth brands
Pfizer brands
Chemical substances for emergency medicine
Chloroarenes
GABAA receptor positive allosteric modulators
Lactams
Sodium channel blockers
World Health Organization essential medicines
Wikipedia medicine articles ready to translate
Lactims